The Swiss League Cup was a football tournament which took place as a summer pre-season tournament in 1972 and 1973, and during the Swiss football season from 1974–75 to 1981–82. The tournament was a knockout competition contested by clubs from the top two levels of Swiss football, the Nationalliga A and Nationalliga B.

Finals

Single match finals

Two-legged finals

Performance By Club

References
 Swiss League Cup results

 
Lea
Recurring sporting events established in 1972
1972 establishments in Switzerland
Recurring sporting events disestablished in 1982
1982 disestablishments in Switzerland
National association football league cups